Kashmir Shaivism or Trika Shaivism, is a nondualist Hindu tradition of Shaiva-Shakta Tantra which originated in Kashmir sometime after 850 CE. Since this tradition originated in Kashmir it is  often called "Kashmiri Shaivism". It later went on to become a pan-Indian movement termed "Trika" (lit. The Trinity) by its great exegete, Abhinavagupta, and particularly flourished in Odisha and Maharashtra. Defining features of the Trika tradition are its idealistic and monistic Pratyabhijna ("Recognition") philosophical system, propounded by Utpaladeva (c. 925–975 CE) and Abhinavagupta (c. 975–1025 CE), and the centrality of the three goddesses Parā, Parāparā, and Aparā.

While Trika draws from numerous Shaiva texts, such as the Shaiva Agamas and the Shaiva and Shakta Tantras, its major scriptural authorities are the Mālinīvijayottara Tantra, the Siddhayogeśvarīmata and the Anāmaka-tantra. Its main exegetical works are those of Abhinavagupta, such as the Tantraloka, Mālinīślokavārttika, and Tantrasāra which are formally an exegesis of the Mālinīvijayottara Tantra, although they also drew heavily on the Kali-based Krama subcategory of the Kulamārga. Another important text of this tradition is the Vijñāna-bhairava-tantra, which focuses on outlining numerous yogic practices.

Kashmir Shaivism shares many parallel points of agreement with the lesser known monistic school of Shaiva Siddhanta as expressed in the Tirumantiram of Tirumular. While also sharing this branch's disagreements with the dualistic Shaiva Siddhanta school of Meykandar which scholars consider to be normative tantric Shaivism.

History

Non-dual Shaiva influences
Dating from around 850–900 CE, the Shiva Sutras of Vasugupta and Spandakārikā were a Śākta Śaiva attempt to present a non-dualistic metaphysics and gnostic soteriology in opposition to the dualistic exegesis of the Meykandar school of Shaiva Siddhanta, while remaining in agreement with the monistic view expressed in the older and arguably more authoritative Tirumantiram of Tirumular. The Shiva Sutras appeared to Vasugupta in a dream, according to tradition. The Spandakārikā was either composed by Vasugupta or his student Bhatta Kallata.

Main theologians of the Trika
The main theologians of Trika Shaivism are those of the Pratyabhijñā (Recognition) school of Shaiva non-dual philosophy.

Somānanda was the first theologian of the recognition school and his main work is the Śivadr̥ṣṭi. However, it was Utpaladeva (c. 900–950 CE) and Abhinavagupta (c. 950–1016, a student of one of Utpaladeva's disciples) who developed the system into its mature form. Utpaladeva's Īśvarapratyabhijñā-kārikā (Verses on the Recognition of the Lord) is one of the main works of this tradition, however, it was overshadowed by the work of Abhinavagupta. Thus, according to Torella,  "Abhinavagupta's Īśvarapratyabhijñā-Vimarśinī and the Īśvarapratyabhijñā-Vivr̥ti-Vimarśinī (a commentary on Utpaladeva’s Vivr̥ti on his own Īśvarapratyabhijñā-Kārikā and Vr̥tti) are generally considered the standard works of the Pratyabhijñā." Torella notes however, that "most of Abhinavagupta’s ideas are just the development of what Utpaladeva had already expounded."

Abhinavagupta's tantric synthesis was the most influential form of the tantric "Kashmir Shaivism". It brought together elements from the following sampradayas (lineages): the Trika, Pratyabhijñā, the Kaula Krama, and Shaiva Siddhantha. 

Abhinavagupta wrote numerous other works on Shaiva tantra. His Tantrāloka, Mālinīślokavārttika, and Tantrasāra are mainly based on the Mālinīvijayottara Tantra, although they also drew heavily on the Kali-based Krama tradition of the Kulamārga. Abhinavagupta's Tantrāloka is probably his most important work. According to Christopher Wallis, "the Tantrāloka is a monumental explication of Tantrik practice and philosophy in over 5,800 verses. It is encyclopedic in its scope though not organized like an encyclopedia, for instead of just enumerating theories and practices, it brings them all into a coherent framework in which everything has its place and everything makes sense in relation to the whole."

One of Abhinavagupta's students, Kshemaraja, is also an important figure who authored the short Pratyabhijñāhṛdayam (The Essence of Self-Recognition).

Jayaratha (1150–1200 CE) wrote a commentary on the Tantrāloka.

Decline and influence 
The institutional basis and support for the Trika Shaiva tradition mostly disappeared with Islamic conquests of the region leading to the slow decline and contraction of the tradition (thought it continued to be passed down and practiced well into the 18th century). 

However, the Trika Shaiva tradition was widely influential on other Indian religious traditions, particularly the Haṭha-yoga traditions, such as the Nāth school of Gorakṣa and the Dasanāmī Sannyāsins, which draw much of their yogic practice and ideas of the subtle body from Trika scriptures. 

Trika Shaivism also strongly influenced the Shakta tradition of Śrīvidyā, which was itself a very influential tradition on mainstream Hinduism, especially in South India. Another tantric tradition influenced by Trika was the post-classical Kalikula (family of Kali) form of Shaktism which is influential in northeastern Indian regions, such as in Bengal, Orissa, and Nepāl.

20th-century revival 

There were no major writers or publications after approximately the 14th century. In the 20th century Swami Lakshman Joo, a Kashmiri Hindu, helped revive both the scholarly and yogic streams of Kashmir Shaivism. His contribution is enormous. He inspired a generation of scholars who made Kashmir Shaivism a legitimate field of inquiry within the academy.

Acharya Rameshwar Jha, a disciple of Lakshman Joo, is often credited with establishing the roots of Kashmir Shaivism in the learned community of Varanasi. Rameshwar Jha with his creativity, familiarity with the ancient texts and personal experiences provided access to concepts of non-dualistic Kashmir Shaivism. His writings of Sanskrit verses have been published as the books Purnta Pratyabhijna and Samit Swatantram.

Swami Muktananda, although not belonging to the direct lineage of Kashmir Shaivism, felt an affinity for the teachings, validated by his own direct experience. He encouraged Motilal Banarsidass to publish Jaideva Singh's translations of Shiva Sutras, Pratyabhijnahrdayam, Spanda Karikas and Vijnana Bhairava, all of which Singh studied in-depth with Lakshman Joo. He also introduced Kashmir Shaivism to a wide audience of western meditators through his writings and lectures on the subject.

The Vijnana Bhairava Tantra, a chapter from the Rudrayamala Tantra, was introduced to the West by Paul Reps, a student of Lakshman Joo, by including an English translation in his book Zen Flesh, Zen Bones. Cast as a discourse between the god Shiva and his consort Devi or Shakti, it presents 112 meditation methods or centering techniques (dharanas).

Practice

Prerequisites 

Since it is a Tantric tradition, a necessary prerequisite for Trika yogic practice is tantric initiation or dīkṣa. The Mālinīvijayottara Tantra, a major source for the tradition, states: "Without initiation there is no qualification for Saiva yoga."

Although domesticated into a householder tradition, Kashmir Shaivism recommended a secret performance of Kaula practices in keeping with its tantric heritage. This was to be done in seclusion from public eyes, therefore allowing one to maintain the appearance of a typical householder.

The Mālinīvijayottara Tantra outlines several major preconditions conferring the authority to practice Yoga:The Yogin who has mastered posture [and] the mind, controlled the vital energy, subdued the senses, conquered sleep, overcome anger and agitation and who is free from deceit, should practise Yoga in a quiet, pleasant cave or earthen hut free from all obstructions.

Six laksyas 

Numerous texts such as the Mālinīvijayottara Tantra also outline six "varieties of the goal" or "targets" (laksyas) of yogic practices, mainly:

 Contemplation of void (vyoman), which bestows all Perfections and liberation.
 Contemplation of body (vigraha), which bestows the coercion of deities like Visnu or Rudra
 Contemplation of drop (bindu), which bestows sovereignty over Yogins
 Contemplation of phoneme (varna), which bestows the Perfection of mantra
 Contemplation of world (bhuvana), which bestows regency of a world
 Contemplation of resonance (dhvani), which leads to isolation and liberation.

Each of the goals is given specific practices. For example, in the Mālinīvijayottara Tantra, perfecting the Void is said to be reached by moving the mind and vital energy (through the use of mantric resonance) through two groups of three voids located along the central channel (which are also correlated with a system of six cakras), reaching to the region above the head. Different scriptures outline different lists of voids and their location in the body. The practice of resonance deals with various sounds, and how the yogin is to focus on a specific sound and its resonance within the central channel.

Regarding mantra, different Saiva tantras and texts teach different mantras and bija (seed) mantras. These mantras are generally intoned (uccara) at different positions in the body along the central channel (such as at the heart, throat, forehead, etc). The Diksottara tantra for example, teaches the intonation of the 'haṃsá''' mantra, beginning in the heart region. Some texts teach "a lineal ascent through the heart, the throat, the palate, and the forehead, culminating with the transcendence of sonic experience as the 'Limit of Resonance' [nadanta] in the cranium is pierced." Other texts have the mantric energy follow the breath through the nose outside the body.

 Yogas 
Since Trika Saivism is a synthesis of various traditions, its texts, like the Mālinīvijayottara Tantra, distinguishes four different types of Saiva yoga. According to Somadev Vasudeva:Two of these have been assimilated from the Tantras of the Siddhanta which has two schools, one monist and the other dualistGanapathy, T.N.. 2013. The Tirumandiram / by Siddhar Tirumular; English translation and commentary. P.3457 [1.] the conquest of the reality-levels (tattvajaya), which has been transformed into a radically new type of yoga based on the fifteen levels of the apperceptive process, and, [2.] the yoga of six ancillaries (ṣaḍaṅgayoga), which is taken over with only minor variations. The third is [3.] Kaula yoga with its system of four immersions (pindastha, padastha, rupastha and rupatita) and as a fourth may be counted [4.] the three types of possession (avesa) taught in the Trika (anava, sakta and sambhava) which are innovatively presented as three meta-categories under which all yogic exercises can be subsumed.

 The conquest of the tattvas 
In Trika texts as well as those of other Saiva schools, it is common to formulate the process of yogic conquest of the realities (tattvas) as a series of Dhāraṇās. Dhāraṇās ("introspections") are "complex sequences of meditative practices" which focus on a series of contemplations on a "hierarchy of apperceptive states designed to bring him ever closer to the level of the highest perceiver, Shiva". This hierarchy of meditations and visualizations is based on the Shaiva schema of the 36 tattvas. According to Somadev Vasudeva, the procedure can be described thus:The Yogin starts by disengaging the mind from external stimuli and then fixes it upon a tattva [such as earth, water, etc] with ever deepening absorption. He attains an internalised vision of the reality, and compares it with his authoritative, scriptural knowledge of the highest level. By means of tarka [reasoning], an ontological value judgement, he discerns that it is different from Siva and thus transcends it. The Yogin’s ascension inevitably brings him to the reality which is Siva at the zenith of all paths.One example of the meditation on the tattva of buddhi (intellect) from the Mālinīvijayottara Tantra is as follows:Contemplating in the heart a lotus with colour of the rising sun, with eight petals containing the [eight bhavas] of dharma etc., and a pericarp, [the Yogin’s] intellect becomes steady within a month. Within six he becomes a knower of the Sruti (scripture). Within three years he himself becomes an author of scriptures. Contemplating his own [physical] form there (in the heart), he perceives the principle of intellect.

 Yoga with six ancillaries (ṣaḍaṅgayoga) 
Trika yoga generally uses a system of six "limbs" or ancillaries (aṅgas) which are seen as subsidiary to the principle conquest of the tattvas. This system was adopted from the Saiva Siddhanta as well as in Pāñcarātra scriptures such as the Jayakhyasamhita. According to Somadeva Vasudeva, in Trika, ṣaḍaṅgayoga "is to be understood as a collection of helpful or even indispensable yogic techniques which enable the prospective Yogin to achieve the required “coalescence” or “identification” (tanmayata, lit. the “consisting-of-that-ness”) with the object of contemplation."

These six subsidiaries as outlined by the Mālinīvijayottara Tantra, are:

Prānāyāma, control of the "breath" or "vital energy" (prana), includes various forms of inhalation, exhalation, kumbhakah, as well as proper posture (asana), defined as either lotus or some other seated posture. The practice of udgatha (eruption) is also taught, which is a "process whereby the retained air is propelled or launched upwards from the navel-region so that it strikes the head."
Dhāranā (fixations or concentrations). Four are taught: Fire, Water, Sovereign (defined as bindu and nada) and Nectar (fixating upon a lunar disc above the cranium which drops divine nectar into the central channel, filling the body).
Tarka (judgment or reasoning), defined as "the ascertainment of what is to be cultivated and what is to be rejected."
Dhyāna (meditation), defined as "attentive contemplation on Siva" or "a focused stream of awareness directed towards the judged and thus accepted reality".
Samādhi, a deep absorption that arises from prolonged (the text states 48 minutes) and "firmly established" meditation, in which the yogin "becomes as though non-existent. He reaches a state where he becomes as though dead, from which even intense sounds and other such [sense data] cannot rouse him."
Pratyāhāra, complete withdrawal of the mind

In the Mālinīvijayottara Tantra (chapter 17), these are seen as six progressive steps leading to complete identification with the object of meditation. It is important to note that different Saiva tantras outline different forms of the six ancillaries, and "there is no consensus as to their order, their definition or even their subdivisions" among the different tantras.

 Yogic suicide 
The practice of utkranti, also called "yogic suicide", is also taught in nondual Saiva Tantras like the Mālinīvijayottara Tantra, which uses the vital energy rising through the central channel to end one's life and proceed to union with Siva. The text says that this abandonment of the body can be done at the end of one's life, after one has mastered all that one has set out to achieve.

 Four upayas 
To attain moksha, sādhana or spiritual practice is necessary. Trika texts describes four major methods (upāya-s) to reach total immersion (samāveśa) into the divine:Wallis, Christopher (2013). Tantra Illuminated, pp. 346-350.

 āṇavopāya, the embodied method or individual method, which emphasizes various techniques which make use of the body, breath, centers of the subtle body (chakras) and the imagination and focuses on the power of action (kriyā-śakti). This method includes most of the usual methods of classical yoga: meditation (dhyāna), prāṇāyāma, visualization, mantras, meditation with seed syllables (varṇa-uccāra), activation of the subtle centers, yogic postures (karaṇa), and meditative ritual performance (pūjā). In the Tantrasāra, Abhinavagupta defines this method as "that which is applied in the spheres of imagination, prāṇa, the body, and external things. There is absolutely no difference among these methods in that the practice of any of them may yield the supreme fruit." 
 śāktopāya, the empowered method, or the method of the power of consciousness. Wallis writes that this method "focuses on shedding mental constructs that are not in alignment with reality (aśuddha-vikalpas) and the cultivation of wisdom, that is, modes of understanding that are in alignment with reality (śuddha-vikalpas)." This method mainly works with the power of knowing (jñāna-śakti) and emphasizes the use of the power of cognition to purify and refine our mental constructs (vikalpas) and the energy of our thoughts and emotions so as to bring them into full alignment with the truth. 
 śāmbhavopāya, the method of consciousness. This method is a way of grace which works with the pure will (icchā-śakti) of consciousness. It is a non-conceptual (nirvikalpa) method, which may work with everyday experiences, bija mantras or certain simple techniques to access the divine, such as gazing at the sky, becoming absorbed in a powerful emotion or the practice of "catching hold of the first moment of perception." Wallis defines it as an "immediate intuitive apprehension of the total flow of reality as it is, free of thought-constructs, dawning within awareness already whole and complete (pūrṇa), even if momentary." 
 anupāya the ‘methodless’ method. Wallis explains this as a very rare case in which "a śaktipāta awakening so intense that one single teaching from a true guru is enough to stabilize that awakening permanently."

Philosophy

Influences and major exponents
The philosophy of Trika Shaivism is called Pratyabhijñā (Recognition) and it is mainly a nondual idealistic and monistic theism.Dyczkowski, Mark S. G. The Doctrine of Vibration: An Analysis of the Doctrines and Practices of Kashmir Shaivism, Motilal Banarsidass Publ., 1989, p. 17. It is influenced by the works of the Saiva monist Vasugupta (c. 800–850 CE) and numerous Śaiva scriptures such as the Agamas, the Śaiva-Śakta Tantras and Kaula scriptures. The Trika philosophical system of Pratyabhijñā is presented in the works of Somānanda (c. 900–950 CE), Utpaladeva (c. 925–975 CE), Abhinavagupta (c. 975–1025 CE) and his disciple Kṣemarāja (c. 1000–1050).

According to Christopher Wallis, the philosophy of Trika Shaivism also adopted much of the ontological apparatus of Sāṅkhya school, such as its system of 25 tattvas, expanding and reinterpreting it for its own system of 36 tattvas. Another important source for Trika is the monistic theism of Tirumular's Shaiva Siddhanta. The Saivas also were influenced by the work of Buddhist Vijñānavāda and Pramanavada philosophers, especially Dharmakirti, who was also taken as a primary non-Saiva opponent and whose doctrines were sometimes absorbed into the Pratyabhijñā system.

Metaphysics and theology
The philosophy of Recognition, as outlined by thinkers like Utpaladeva, teaches that though the identity of all souls is one with God (Isvara) or Shiva (which is the single reality, Being and absolute consciousness), they have forgotten this due to Maya or ignorance. However, through knowledge one can recognize one's authentic divine nature and become a liberated being. Another important element of Trika theology is the active and dynamic nature of consciousness, which is described as the spontaneous vibration or pulsation (spanda) of universal consciousness, which is an expression of its freedom (svātāntrya) and power (Śakti). Because of this, though this philosophy is idealist, it affirms the reality of the world and everyday life, as a real transformation (parinama), manifestation or appearance (ābhāsa) of the absolute consciousness. The Absolute is also explained through the metaphor of light (prakasha) and reflective awareness (vimarsha).

The basic theology of the Trika's Recognition school is summed up by Utpaladeva in the Īśvarapratyabhijñā-Kārikā (Verses on the Recognition of the Lord) as follows:There is only one Great Divinity, and it is the very inner Self of all creatures. It embodies itself as all things, full of unbroken awareness of three kinds: “I”, “this”, and “I am this.”The school's theology is expressed by Kshemaraja in his Pratyabhijñā-hṛdayam (The Heart of Recognition) as follows:Awareness, free and independent, is the cause of the performance of everything. She unfolds the universe through Her own will and on Her own canvas. It becomes diverse by its division into mutually adapting subjects and objects. The individual conscious being, as a condensation of universal Awareness, embodies the entire universe in a microcosmic form.The modern scholar-practitioner of Shaiva Tantra, Christopher Wallis outlines the metaphysics and theology of non-dual Shaiva Tantra thus:

All that exists, throughout all time and beyond, is one infinite divine Consciousness, free and blissful, which projects within the field of its awareness a vast multiplicity of apparently differentiated subjects and objects: each object an actualization of a timeless potentiality inherent in the Light of Consciousness, and each subject the same plus a contracted locus of self-awareness. This creation, a divine play, is the result of the natural impulse within Consciousness to express the totality of its self-knowledge in action, an impulse arising from love. The unbounded Light of Consciousness contracts into finite embodied loci of awareness out of its own free will. When those finite subjects then identify with the limited and circumscribed cognitions and circumstances that make up this phase of their existence, instead of identifying with the transindividual overarching pulsation of pure Awareness that is their true nature, they experience what they call “suffering.” To rectify this, some feel an inner urge to take up the path of spiritual gnosis and yogic practice, the purpose of which is to undermine their misidentification and directly reveal within the immediacy of awareness the fact that the divine powers of Consciousness, Bliss, Willing, Knowing, and Acting comprise the totality of individual experience as well—thereby triggering a recognition that one’s real identity is that of the highest Divinity, the Whole in every part. This experiential gnosis is repeated and reinforced through various means until it becomes the nonconceptual ground of every moment of experience, and one’s contracted sense of self and separation from the Whole is finally annihilated in the incandescent radiance of the complete expansion into perfect wholeness. Then one’s perception fully encompasses the reality of a universe dancing ecstatically in the animation of its completely perfect divinity.This single supreme reality is also sometimes referred to as Aham (the heart). It is considered to be a non-dual interior space of Śiva, support for the entire manifestation, supreme mantra and identical to Śakti. In Kashmir Shivaism the highest form of Kali is Kalasankarshini who is nirguna, formless and is often show as a flame above the head of Guhya Kali the highest gross form of Kali. In Nepali Newar arts, both form and formless attributes of Kali is often envisioned in a single art form showing the hierarchy of goddesses in their tradition. In it Guhyakali image culminates in flame, with Kalasankarshini, the highest deity in the sequence, who consumes time within herself and is envisioned solely as a flame representing Para Brahman.

Theology of the Triad or Trika

An important element of Trika Shaivism's theology is the use of several triads (symbolized by the trident) in its theological explanation of the Absolute reality. There are several triads described in Trika theology of thinkers like Abhinavagupta, including:

Three powers: Icchā (will), Jñāna (knowledge), and Kriyā (action). Any action of any being, including God, is subject to these three fundamental energies. Iccha or Will is in the beginning of any action or process. Jnana by which the action is clearly expressed first in mind, before it is put into action. Then comes Kriyā, the energy of the action.
 Three entities: pati (Śiva), pāśa (bondage), paśu (soul)
 Shakti Triad or Three Goddesses: Parā (transcendence), Parāparā (transcendence and immanence) and Aparā śakti (immanence)
 Three aspects of knowledge: Pramatri (the subject), Pramana (the modalities of knowledge) and Prameya - the known object
 Three states of consciousness: jāgrat (waking), svapna (dreaming) and suṣupti (dreamless sleep)
 Three-fold spiritual path: Śāmbhavopāya, Śāktopāya and  The transcendental triad: prakāśa (luminosity), vimarśa (dynamics),sāmarasya (homogeneous bliss)
 The three impurities: āṇavamala, māyā, karma.

Comparison with Advaita Vedanta
Kashmir Shaivism and Advaita Vedanta are both non-dual philosophies that give primacy to Universal Consciousness (Chit or Brahman). In Kashmir Shaivism, all things are a manifestation of this Consciousness, but the phenomenal world (Śakti) is real, existing and having its being in Consciousness (Chit).

Texts
Teachings are also drawn from the Tantrāloka of Abhinavagupta, prominent among a vast body of smritis employed by Kashmir Shaivism.

In general, the whole written tradition of Shaivism can be divided in three fundamental parts: Āgama Śāstra, Spanda Śāstra and Pratyabhijñā Śāstra.

1. Āgama Śāstra are those writings that are considered as being a direct revelation from Siva. These writings were first communicated orally, from the master to the worthy disciple. There are also numerous commentaries to these works,  having most of them.

2.

3. Pratyabhijñā Śāstra are those writings which have mainly a metaphysical content. Due to their extremely high spiritual and intellectual level, this part of the written tradition of Shaivism is the least accessible for the uninitiated. Nevertheless, this corpus of writings refer to the simplest and most direct modality of spiritual realization. Pratyabhijñā means "recognition" and refers to the spontaneous recognition of the divine nature hidden in each human being (atman). Before Utpaladeva, his master Somānanda wrote  (The Vision of Siva''), a devotional poem written on multiple levels of meaning.

See also
 Lalleshwari 
 Swami Lakshman Joo
 Bhagwan Gopinath 
 Igor Kufayev

References

Sources

Further reading

External links

David Peter Lawrence (2005) Kashmiri Shaiva Philosophy, Internet Encyclopedia of Philosophy
Piyaray L. Raina, Kashmir Shaivism versus Vedanta – A Synopsis

 
Hindu denominations
Theistic Indian philosophy
Advaita Shaivism
Nondualism
Yoga styles